Udders is a Singapore-based ice cream parlour franchise, established in 2007. It is owned by David Yim.

History
David Lin and his wife Peck established Udders in 2007 and opened the first store at United Square.

Services 

The company organizes ice-cream making workshops and provides ice-cream catering services.

Operations
The business has expanded to 400 locations across Southeast Asia. As of February 2022, Udders has six outlets in Singapore.

References

Ice cream parlors
Food and drink companies of Singapore
Singaporean brands